There are three writing systems for Saraiki, but very few of the language's speakers, even those who are literate in other languages, are able to read or write Saraiki in any writing system.

Multani script
Multani is a Brahmic script originating in the Multan region of Punjab. The script was used for routine writing and commercial activities. Multani is one of four Landa scripts whose usage was extended beyond the mercantile domain and formalized for literary activity and printing; the others being Gurmukhi (Punjabi), Khojki (Marwari) and Khudawadi (Sindhi). Although Multani is now obsolete, it is a historical script in which written and printed records exist.

Traders or bookkeepers wrote in a script known as Langdi, although use of this script has been significantly reduced in recent times. Preliminary Proposal to Encode the Multani Script in ISO/IEC 10646 was submitted by Anshuman Pandey, on 26-04-2011. Saraiki Unicode has been approved in 2005.

Perso-Arabic script
The most common Saraiki writing system today is the Perso-Arabic script, as standardized in Pakistan as an extension to the Shahmukhi alphabet. Saraiki has a 43-letter alphabet including, which includes four letters not used in the related Punjabi and Hindko languages. Another difference the Saraiki alphabet has with Shahmukhi is the disuse of the already uncommon Lam with tah above which is present in standard Shahmukhi.

Alphabet Table

Notes
Saraiki has 4 additional glyphs that are not present in its parent alphabet of Shahmukhi. ٻ represents the Voiced bilabial implosive, ڄ represents the Voiced palatal implosive, ڳ  represents the Voiced velar implosive, and ݙ represents the Voiced retroflex implosive. 3 out of the 4 implosive consonants (ٻ,ڄ,ڳ) are shared with the Sindhi alphabet, and ݙ was proposed in 2002 to differentiate from ڏ of Sindhi.
 
Saraiki also lacks the phoneme /ʒ/, and therefore, employs other phonemes such as /ʃ/ to represent the letter ژ. Due to this, ژ is only used in loanwords.

Diacritics

 (ئ ؤ and stand alone ء) hamza: indicates a glottal stop.
 ḥarakāt (In Arabic: حركات also called تشكيل tashkīl):
 (ــَـ) fatḥa (a)
 (ــِـ) kasra (i)
 (ــُـ) ḍamma (u)
 (ــْـ) sukūn (no vowel)
 (ــٰـ) superscript alif (also "short" or "dagger alif": A replacement for an original alif that is dropped in the writing out of some rare words, e.g. لاكن is not written out with the original alif found in the word pronunciation, instead it is written out as لٰكن.
 (ــّـ) shadda: Gemination (doubling) of consonants.
(--ٖ--) Arabic subscript alef (U+0656), KhaRRi Zeer
(___ٗ__)  Inverted Zamma , Ulti Pesh , Such as in : کٗرتا، مٗردا 
(___٘__) Ghunna, over the noon
 Tanween
    

 (__ً_) ݙو زبر
 (ٍ--) ݙو زیر
  ݙو پیش

Numerals
Saraiki uses the Eastern Arabic numerals:

Romanization
Romanization is often termed "transliteration" but that is not strictly correct,  as transliteration is the direct representation of letters by using foreign symbols, but most systems for romanizing Arabic are actually transcription systems that represent the sound of the language.

For Saraiki, all letters and symbols are used in Saraiki in Latin script.

Modern Indic scripts
The Devanagari and Gurmukhi scripts, written from left to right, were used by Hindus and Sikhs respectively around Saraikistan. Though not used in present-day Pakistan, there are still emigrant speakers in India who know the Devanagari or Gurmukhi scripts for Saraiki.

Devanagari has support for all the 4 Saraiki implosive consonants: ॻ (ڳ), ॼ (ڄ), ॾ (ݙ) and ॿ (ٻ), which were actually introduced to write Sindhi. In Gurmukhi, these are approximated by gemination ligatures.

References

External links
 Download Saraiki font and keyboard  for Windows and Android
Saraiki Keyboard in Roman
Saraiki Matchine Transliteration Software

Persian alphabets
Arabic alphabets
Hindustani orthography
Saraiki language
Alphabets
Arabic alphabets for South Asian languages